Tree63 is a contemporary Christian music band from Durban, South Africa.

History

The band was formed in 1996 and originally, it was unnamed. In 1997, the band had to come up with a name before performing at North Beach, Durban, and came up with "Tree". They added the "63" part of their name in 2000 due to a naming conflict with an American band. 63 had been the name of their second album, which was named in reference to Psalm 63.

Their first album released in the United States, Tree63, won the GMA Dove Award for Rock Album of the Year in 2001.

Tree63's recording of Matt Redman's "Blessed Be Your Name" helped to spark the song's popularity. This recording was featured on the 2005 edition of WOW Hits and was nominated for two Dove Awards. On a 2 February 2007 broadcast of 20, The Countdown Magazine (special edition, Praise and Worship), guest Chris Tomlin described Tree63's rendition of "Blessed Be Your Name" as "...the definitive recording of one of the most all-encompassing songs in the entire world of Christian music."  The song was then announced as the number 3 Praise and Worship song of all time.

Tree63 parted ways in 2009, and John Ellis returned to South Africa, where he started his solo career.  His debut solo album, Come Out Fighting, was released in June 2010.

Splashy Fen Music Festival announced that Tree63 would be part of their line-up in 2014.

In November 2014, Tree63 released previously unreleased songs from 2006. They claimed that the tracks were considered candidates for their Sunday! album.

After reconvening in 2014 for a series of celebratory South African concerts, talk of a new album and resumed live work resurfaced and the band began work on their new album in Nashville in November 2014.

Members
Current
 John Ellis — vocals, guitar, piano
 Darryl Swart — drums
 Daniel Ornellas — bass

Former
 Thinus "Tain" Odendaal — drums
 Jon "Scoop" Randall — bass, backing vocals
 Martin "Mort" Engel — bass

Discography

Studio albums

EP
  UNFINISHED DREAM – Songs from the Sunday Sessions

Singles

Awards

In 2005, Tree63's version of Matt Redman's song, "Blessed Be Your Name", was nominated for a Dove Award for "Song of the Year" and won the "Worship Song of the Year" award at the 36th GMA Dove Awards.

References

External links

South African rock music groups
Performers of contemporary worship music
Christian rock groups
Inpop Records artists